25143 Itokawa (provisional designation ) is a sub-kilometer near-Earth object of the Apollo group and a potentially hazardous asteroid. It was discovered by the LINEAR program in 1998 and later named after Japanese rocket engineer Hideo Itokawa. Due to its low density and high porosity, Itokawa is considered to be a rubble pile, consisting of numerous boulders of different sizes rather than of a single solid body.

It was the first asteroid to be the target of a sample return mission, the Japanese space probe Hayabusa, which collected more than 1500 regolith dust particles from the asteroid's surface in 2005. After its return to Earth in 2010, the mineralogy, petrography, chemistry, and isotope ratios of these particles have been studied in detail, providing insights into the evolution of the Solar System. Itokawa was the smallest asteroid to be photographed and visited by a spacecraft prior to the DART mission to Dimorphos in 2022.

Discovery and naming 
Itokawa was discovered on 26 September 1998 by astronomers with the Lincoln Near-Earth Asteroid Research (LINEAR) program at Lincoln Laboratory's Experimental Test Site near Socorro, New Mexico, in the United States. It was given the provisional designation . The body's observation arc begins with its first observation by the Sloan Digital Sky Survey just one week prior to its official discovery observation. The minor planet was named in memory of Japanese rocket scientist Hideo Itokawa (1912–1999), who is regarded as the father of Japanese rocketry. The official  was published by the Minor Planet Center on 6 August 2003.

Orbit and classification 
Itokawa belongs to the Apollo asteroids. They are Earth-crossing asteroids and the largest dynamical group of near-Earth objects with nearly 10,000 known members. Itokawa orbits the Sun at a distance of 0.95–1.70 AU once every 18 months (557 days; semi-major axis of 1.32 AU). Its orbit has an eccentricity of 0.28 and an inclination of 2° with respect to the ecliptic.

Exploration 

In 2000, it was selected as the target of Japan's Hayabusa mission. Hayabusa landed on 20 November for thirty minutes, but it failed to operate a device designed to collect soil samples. On 25 November, a second landing and sampling sequence was attempted. The sample capsule was returned to Earth and landed at Woomera, South Australia on 13 June 2010, around 13:51 UTC (23:21 local). On 16 November 2010, the Japan Aerospace Exploration Agency reported that dust collected during Hayabusa's voyage was indeed from the asteroid.

Surface features 
Names of major surface features were proposed by Hayabusa scientists and accepted by the Working Group for Planetary System Nomenclature of the International Astronomical Union. Also, the Hayabusa science team is using working names for smaller surface features. The following tables list the names of geological features on the asteroid. No naming conventions have been disclosed for surface features on Itokawa.

Craters 
Ten impact craters on the surface of Itokawa were named on 18 February 2009.

Regiones 
Regio or regiones are large area marked by reflectivity or color distinctions from adjacent areas in planetary geology. The following regiones have been named on Itokawa.

Physical characteristics 

Itokawa is a stony S-type asteroid. Radar imaging by Goldstone in 2001 observed an ellipsoid  meters long and  meters wide.

The Hayabusa mission confirmed these findings and also suggested that Itokawa may be a contact binary formed by two or more smaller asteroids that have gravitated toward each other and stuck together. The Hayabusa images show a surprising lack of impact craters and a very rough surface studded with boulders, described by the mission team as a rubble pile. Furthermore, the density of the asteroid is too low for it to be made from solid rock. This would mean that Itokawa is not a monolith but rather a rubble pile formed from fragments that have cohered over time.

Rotation period and poles 
Since 2001, a large number of rotational lightcurves of Itokawa have been obtained from photometric observations. Analysis of the best-rated lightcurve by Mikko Kaasalainen gave a sidereal rotation period of  hours with a high brightness variation of 0.8 magnitude, indicative of the asteroid's non-spherical shape. In addition, Kaasalainen also determined two spin axes of (355.0°, −84.0°) and (39°, −87.0°) in ecliptic coordinates (λ, β). Alternative lightcurve measurements were made by Lambert ( h), Lowry ( and  h), Ohba ( h), Warner ( h), Ďurech ( h), and Nishihara ( h).

Composition 

The 26 August 2011 issue of Science devoted six articles to findings based on dust that Hayabusa had collected from Itokawa. Scientists' analysis suggested that Itokawa was probably made up from interior fragments of a larger asteroid that broke apart. Dust collected from the asteroid surface is thought to have been exposed there for about eight million years.

Scientists used varied techniques of chemistry and mineralogy to analyze the dust from Itokawa. Itokawa composition was found to match the common type of meteorites known as "low-total-iron, low metal ordinary chondrites". Another team of scientists determined that the dark iron color on the surface of Itokawa was the result of abrasion by micrometeoroids and high-speed particles from the Sun which had converted the normally whitish iron oxide coloring.

2018 Hayabusa results 

Two separate groups report water in different Itokawa particles. Jin et al. report water in low-calcium pyroxene grains. The water's isotope level corresponds with inner Solar System and carbonaceous chondrite water isotope levels. Daly et al. report "OH and " apparently formed by implantation of solar wind hydrogen. The rims of an olivine particle "show an enrichment of up to ~1.2 at % in OH and H2O". The water concentrations of the Itokawa grains would indicate an estimated BSI (Bulk Silicate Itokawa) water content in line with Earth's bulk water, and that Itokawa had been a "water-rich asteroid".

2020 Hayabusa results 

At the 2020 Lunar and Planetary Science Conference, a third group reported water and organics, via a third Hayabusa particle- RA-QD02-0612, or "Amazon." Olivine, pyroxene, and albite contain water. Isotopic compositions indicate a clear extraterrestrial origin.

2021 Hayabusa results 
A further report by Daly's group was published which supported the theory that a large source of earth's water has come from hydrogen atoms carried on particles in the solar wind which combine with oxygen on asteroids and then arrive on earth in space dust. Using atom probe tomography the study found hydroxide and water molecules on the surface of a single grain from particles retrieved from the asteroid Itokawa by the Japanese space probe Hayabusa.

See also 
 162173 Ryugu, target of sample-return mission Hayabusa2, the successor to Hayabusa
 101955 Bennu, target of NASA sample-return mission OSIRIS-REx
 , target of cancelled NASA sample-return mission Asteroid Redirect Mission

Notes

References

Further reading

External links

 Hayabusa's Scientific and Engineering Achievements during Proximity Operations around Itokawa  (JAXA press release)
 Gazetteer of Planetary Nomenclature
 MIT's LINEAR asteroid named for Japan's 'Dr. Rocket' (MIT press release)
 JAXA Hayabusa official page
 Earth impact probability of the Asteroid (25143) Itokawa to be sampled by the spacecraft Hayabusa (paper abstract)
 Astronomy Picture of the Day: Approaching Asteroid Itokawa, A Robot's Shadow on Asteroid Itokawa, The Missing Craters of Asteroid Itokawa, Smooth Sections on Asteroid Itokawa
 Special issue: Hayabusa at Itokawa, Science, Vol. 312, no. 5778, 2 June 2006
 Initial Scientific Results of Hayabusa’s Investigation on Itokawa ~Summary of the Special Issue of "Science"Magazine~ (ISAS/JAXA press release)
 Hot Topic: Hayabusa—Dust from Itokawa, Science, Vol. 333, no. 6046, 26 August 2011
 Animated model of Itokawa rotating (in anaglyph form for use with red-blue glasses)
 Itokawa in enhanced color (From this presentation)
 List of the Potentially Hazardous Asteroids (PHAs), Minor Planet Center
 PHA Close Approaches To The Earth, Minor Planet Center
 List Of Apollo Minor Planets (by designation), Minor Planet Center
 
 

025143
025143
Named minor planets
20050912
025143
Extraterrestrial water
025143
025143
19980926